Bajestan (also Romanized as Bajestān and Bejestān; also known as Bījestān and Bījistān) is a city and capital of Bajestan County, in Razavi Khorasan Province, Iran. At the 2006 census, its population was 11,136, in 3,090 families.

The most important products of Bajestan are saffron and pomegranate.

The city has a dry climate with significant difference between day and night temperatures. It is a fast-growing city, thus becoming one of the major centres in the south of Razavi Khorasan.

there are some historical places in Bajestan such as fakhrabad caravanserai ، ghasem abad caravanserai، zeinabad caravanserai، bajestan grand mosque ، yonsi Bridge ، marandiz mosque ، mazar mosque and castle and mazar monastery in various post islamic era. 

Bajestan salt desert is a beautiful natural scenery attracting tourism groups from adjacent cities ، but because this desert is a dried Salt Lake ، camping is not possible in winter and late autumn.

See also 

 List of cities, towns and villages in Razavi Khorasan Province

References 

Cities in Razavi Khorasan Province
Populated places in Bajestan County